Gerald Edward Bermingham (born 20 August 1940) is a British politician and barrister, and was Labour Member of Parliament for St Helens South from 1983 until 2001.

He was born 20 August 1940 in Dublin, Ireland, and educated at Cotton College, Wellingborough Grammar School and Sheffield University, where he obtained a degree in law.  He was admitted as a solicitor in 1967, and was called to the Bar (Gray's Inn) in 1985. He was a Sheffield City councillor from 1975 to 1979. He contested South East Derbyshire in 1979, but was defeated by the incumbent Conservative Peter Rost.

In 1994, he was one of six Labour MPs who voted against any reduction in the age of consent for homosexuals, even to 18 (at the time, the age of consent was 21).

On his retirement, he was succeeded by Shaun Woodward, a Conservative defector, who swapped his old seat of Witney to represent the ultra-safe St Helens South.

Legal career

Bermingham continues to practise from No 5 Chambers, a Birmingham barristers' chambers, in the field of criminal law.

References

1940 births
Living people
Alumni of the University of Sheffield
Labour Party (UK) MPs for English constituencies
UK MPs 1983–1987
UK MPs 1987–1992
UK MPs 1992–1997
UK MPs 1997–2001